A marine heatwave (abbreviated as MHW) is a period of abnormally high ocean temperatures relative to the average seasonal temperature in a particular marine region. Marine heatwaves are caused by a variety of factors, including shorter term weather phenomena such as fronts, intraseasonal, annual, or decadal modes like El Niño events, and longer term changes like climate change. Marine heatwaves can lead to severe biodiversity changes such as coral bleaching, sea star wasting disease, harmful algal blooms, and mass mortality of benthic communities. Unlike heatwaves on land, marine heatwaves can extend for millions of square kilometers, persist for weeks to months or even years, and occur at subsurface levels.

Major marine heatwave events such as Great Barrier Reef 2002, Mediterranean 2003, Northwest Atlantic 2012, and Northeast Pacific 2013-2016 have had drastic and long-term impacts on the oceanographic and biological conditions in those areas.

The IPCC Sixth Assessment Report stated in 2022 that "marine heatwaves are more frequent [...], more intense and longer [...] since the 1980s, and since at least 2006 very likely attributable to anthropogenic climate change". This confirms earlier findings, for example in the Special Report on the Ocean and Cryosphere in a Changing Climate from 2019 which stated that it is "virtually certain" that the global ocean has absorbed more than 90% of the excess heat in our climate systems, the rate of ocean warming has doubled, and marine heatwave events have doubled in frequency since 1982.

Definition
The IPCC Sixth Assessment Report defines marine heatwave as follows: "A period during which water temperature is abnormally warm for the time of the year relative to historical temperatures, with that extreme warmth persisting for days to months. The phenomenon can manifest in any place in the ocean and at scales of up to thousands of kilometres."

Another publication defined it as follows: an anomalously warm event is a marine heatwave "if it lasts for five or more days, with temperatures warmer than the 90th percentile based on a 30-year historical baseline period".

Categories 

The quantitative and qualitative categorization of marine heatwaves establishes a naming system, typology, and characteristics for marine heatwave events. The naming system is applied by location and year: for example Mediterranean 2003. This allows researchers to compare the drivers and characteristics of each event, geographical and historical trends of marine heatwaves, and easily communicate marine heatwave events as they occur in real-time. 

The categorization system is on a scale from 1 to 4. Category 1 is a moderate event, Category 2 is a strong event, Category 3 is a severe event, and Category 4 is an extreme event. The category applied to each event in real-time is defined primarily by sea surface temperature anomalies (SSTA), but over time it comes to include typology and characteristics. 

The types of marine heatwaves are symmetric, slow onset, fast onset, low intensity, and high intensity. Marine heatwave events may have multiple categories such as slow onset, high intensity. The characteristics of marine heatwave events include duration, intensity (max, average, cumulative), onset rate, decline rate, region, and frequency.

Drivers 

The drivers for marine heatwave events can be broken into local processes, teleconnection processes, and regional climate patterns. Two quantitative measurements of these drivers have been proposed to identify marine heatwave, mean sea surface temperature and sea surface temperature variability. 

At the local level marine heatwave events are dominated by ocean advection, air-sea fluxes, thermocline stability, and wind stress. Teleconnection processes refer to climate and weather patterns that connect geographically distant areas. For marine heatwave, the teleconnection process that play a dominant role are atmospheric blocking/subsidence, jet-stream position, oceanic kelvin waves, regional wind stress, warm surface air temperature, and seasonal climate oscillations. These processes contribute to regional warming trends that disproportionately effect Western boundary currents. 

Regional climate patterns such as interdecadal oscillations like El Niño Southern Oscillation (ENSO) have contributed to marine heatwave events such as "The Blob" in the Northeastern Pacific. 

Drivers that operate on the scale of biogeographical realms or the Earth as a whole are Decadal oscillations, like Pacific Decadal Oscillations (PDO), and anthropogenic ocean warming due to climate change.

Ocean areas of carbon sinks in the mid-latitudes of both hemispheres and carbon outgassing areas in upwelling regions of the tropical Pacific have been identified as places where persistent marine heatwaves occur; the air-sea gas exchange is being studied in these areas.

Climate change as an additional driver 
CMIP6 projections from the IPCC Sixth Assessment Report in 2022 agree with an earlier report (Special Report on the Ocean and Cryosphere in a Changing Climate in 2019) that marine heatwaves will "very likely further increase in frequency, duration, spatial extent and intensity under future global warming in the 21st century". They project marine heatwaves will become "four times more frequent in 2081–2100 compared to 1995–2014" under the lower emissions scenarios called SSP1-2.6, or eight times more frequent under the higher emissions scenarios called SSP5-8.5. The emissions scenarios are called SSP for Shared Socioeconomic Pathways.

It is virtually certain that sea surface temperatures (SSTs) will continue to increase in the 21st  century, at a rate depending on emission scenarios: "The  future global average SST increase projected by CMIP6 models for the period 1995–2014 to 2081–2100 is 0.86°C under SSP1-2.6, 1.51°C under SSP2-4.5, 2.19°C under SSP3-7.0, and 2.89°C under SSP5-8.5".

Many species already experience these temperature shifts during the course of marine heatwave events. There are many increased risk factors and health impacts to coastal and inland communities as global average temperature and extreme heat events increase.

List of events 
Sea surface temperatures have been recorded since 1904 in Port Erin, UK and measurements continue through global organizations such as NOAA, NASA, and many more. Events can be identified from 1925 till present day. The list below is not a complete representation of all marine heatwave events that have ever been recorded.

Impacts

On marine ecosystems 
Changes in the thermal environment of terrestrial and marine organisms can have drastic effects on their health and well-being. marine heatwave events have been shown to increase habitat degradation, change species range dispersion, complicate management of environmentally and economically important fisheries, contribute to mass mortalities of species, and in general reshape ecosystems.

Habitat degradation occurs through alterations of the thermal environment and subsequent restructuring and sometimes complete loss of biogenic habitats such as seagrass beds, corals, and kelp forests. These habitats contain a significant proportion of the oceans biodiversity. Changes in ocean current systems and local thermal environments have shifted many tropical species' range northward while temperate species have lost their southern limits. Large range shifts along with outbreaks of toxic algal blooms has impacted many species across taxa. Management of these affected species becomes increasingly difficult as they migrate across management boundaries and the food web dynamics shift.

Increases in sea surface temperature have been linked to a decline in species abundance such as the mass mortality of 25 benthic species in the Mediterranean in 2003, the Sea Star Wasting Disease, and coral bleaching events. Climate change-related exceptional marine heatwaves in the Mediterranean Sea during 2015–2019 resulted in widespread mass sealife die-offs in five consecutive years. The impact of more frequent and prolonged marine heatwave events will have drastic implications for the distribution of species.

Coral bleaching

On weather patterns 
Research on how marine heatwaves influence atmospheric conditions is emerging. Marine heatwaves in the tropical Indian Ocean are found to result in dry conditions over the central Indian subcontinent. At the same time, there is an increase in rainfall over south peninsular India in response to marine heatwaves in the northern Bay of Bengal. These changes are in response to the modulation of the monsoon winds by the marine heatwaves.

Options for reducing impacts 

The IPCC Sixth Assessment Report of 2022 recommended "advanced seasonal forecasts, real-time predictions, monitoring responses, education, and possible fisheries impacts and adaptation".

To address the root cause of more frequent and more intense marine heatwaves, climate change mitigation methods are needed to curb the increase in global temperature and in ocean temperatures.

See also 

 Effects of climate change on oceans
 Heat wave
 The Blob (Pacific Ocean)

References

External links
 Marine Heatwaves International Working Group 

Climate change and the environment
Physical oceanography
Ocean pollution
Heat waves
Effects of climate change